Baloch Americans are Americans of Baloch descent.

A 2015 eight-part documentary by VSH News, the first Balochi language news channel, called Balochs in America, shows that Baloch Americans live in different parts of the United States, including Washington D.C., New York, Texas, North Carolina and Washington. Many Baloch Americans come from Pakistan, both from Balochistan province and Karachi city and elsewhere in Pakistan. Others come from the Iranian province of Sistan and Baluchistan. Many Baloch Americans work at nonprofits, information technology companies and in the public sector.

Political activism 
Baloch Americans are politically active in dealing with issues concerning the Baloch population in Iran and Pakistan. A congressional hearing of the United States (US) Committee on Foreign Affairs on February 8, 2012, chaired by Republican Congressman Dana Rohrabacher, highlighted human rights atrocities attributed to the Pakistani security forces in Balochistan. The hearing drew severe criticism from the Pakistani government which described it as interference into its domestic problems.

Soon after the hearing on Balochistan, Rohrabacher introduced a resolution in the US House of Representatives on February 18, 2012, calling upon Pakistan to recognise the Baloch right to self-determination. House Representatives Louie Gohmert and Steve King co-sponsored the motion that highlighted Balochistan's troubled past with Pakistan. In an op-ed published in The Washington Post, Why I support Baluchistan, Rohrabacher said, "I make no apology for submitting a resolution championing the oppressed people of Baluchistan in their dealings with a Pakistani government that has betrayed our trust."

Baloch Americans staged a demonstration outside the White House to protest a visit by Pakistani Prime Minister Nawaz Sharif in October 2013.

On October 22, 2015, a Baloch activist named Ahmar Mastikhan heckled Pakistan's Prime Minister Nawaz Sharif during his speech at the U.S. Institute for Peace. The protester chanted "free free Balochistan". 

Baloch activists from the Baloch National Movement (BNM) protested outside the White House on February 13, 2016 to condemn the killing of BNM Secretary General Dr. Manan Baloch.

On September 14, 2016, Baloch activists protested outside the United Nations Headquarters to condemn what they described to be Pakistan's "illegal occupation" of Balochistan.

Organizations 

The Balochistan Institute in Washington D.C., founded by Malik Siraj Akbar in February 2016, is a think tank focused on research and dialogue on Balochistan. The podcast DC Live tells the stories of the Baloch Americans.

Notable people

 Malik Siraj Akbar, journalist
 Mahnoor Baloch, actress and model
 Dr. Wahid Baloch, Washington advocate and President of the Baloch Council of North America
 Noon Meem Danish, poet of African-Baloch descent
 Chiragh Baloch, artist

References

Asian-American society
Baloch diaspora
South Asian American
Pakistani American
 
Middle Eastern American
Iranian American